Ein schöner Tag (English: A beautiful day) is the first single from the 2001 Schiller gold album Weltreise with vocals by German singer Isgaard and spoken word passages by German actress and voice actress Franziska Pigulla (* 6 May 1965), who became famous in the German-speaking countries as a narrator of countless documentaries and as the voice of FBI Special Agent Dana Scully from The X-Files. The song is titled internationally as "A Beautiful Day". The trance music single was officially released on 5 September 2000 in Germany and was peaking at number 40 on German Singles Chart in 2000 and at number 91 in Switzerland. The cover art work shows a graphic of the sun.

The styles of the song and of the music video of Ein schöner Tag are very close to the previous single Ruhe. The vocals by Isgaard are a sample of the theme "Un bel dì vedremo" from the opera "Madame Butterfly" by Giacomo Puccini. The spoken words by Pigulla are:

Translation from German: "A beautiful day - when it comes to an end, nothing is as it was."

In 2003 English soprano Sarah Brightman released a cover version of "A Beautiful Day" on her album Harem as "It's a Beautiful Day". In 2014 Schiller released a new version of the song called Un Bel Di / Ein schöner Tag. It features vocals by the Russian singer Eva Mali and the London Symphony Orchestra. The song will be included on Opus - White Album and had its premiere in the Schiller Lounge on German Klassik Radio.

Track listing

Maxi single

Vinyl

Credits and personnel 

 Composed and produced by Christopher von Deylen and Mirko von Schlieffen
 Vocals by Isgaard
 Voice by Franziska Pigulla
 Recorded and mixed at the Sleepingroom in Hamburg
 Voice recorded by Stefan Knauthe at the Kokon Studio in Berlin

Music video 

The official music video for "Ein schöner Tag" was produced by Blau Medien GmbH and was shot in 2000 by German director Marcus Sternberg. The director of photography was Gero Steffen and the unit manager was Oliver Schertlein. It has a length of 3:45 minutes. The video features some people of Asian origin in a Japanese garden and fighters in a forest. The video was aired and was shown for example on German music television channel VIVA in 2000.

Charts 

 Sarah Brightman version 

English Soprano Sarah Brightman released her cover of "A Beautiful Day" on her album Harem in 2003 with the title "It's a Beautiful Day".

Credits:

 Backing vocals by Frank Peterson
 Narrator: Chiara Ferraú
 Sitar by Peter Weihe
 Tabla by Kuljid Bhamra

 References

External links 
 
 
 
 The single on Discogs

Schiller (band) songs
2000 singles
2000 songs
Songs written by Christopher von Deylen